Symphlebia dissimulata is a moth in the family Erebidae. It was described by Reich in 1936. It is found in Brazil.

References

Moths described in 1936
dissimulata